Three Rivers South is a census-designated place (CDP) and unincorporated community in Deschutes County, Oregon, United States. It is part of the Bend, Oregon Metropolitan Statistical Area. The population was 3,014 at the 2010 census.

Geography
Three Rivers South is located in south-central Deschutes County, south of Sunriver and north of La Pine, just west of U.S. Route 97. The Deschutes and Little Deschutes rivers join in the CDP, with the Little Deschutes passing through the eastern part of the CDP and the Deschutes River passing through the west. The Spring River is a short spring-fed river in the northern part of the CDP that joins the Deschutes River from the west.

Demographics

As of the census of 2000, there were 2,445 people, 991 households, and 709 families residing in the CDP. The population density was 257.6 people per square mile (99.5/km2). There were 1,575 housing units at an average density of 165.9/sq mi (64.1/km2). The racial makeup of the CDP was 94.81% White, 0.37% Black, 1.43% Native American, 0.29% Asian, 0.41% from other races, and 2.70% from two or more races. Hispanic or Latino of any race were 2.70% of the population.

There were 991 households, out of which 32.0% had children under the age of 18 living with them, 59.2% were married couples living together, 8.4% had a female householder with no husband present, and 28.4% were non-families. 20.1% of all households were made up of individuals, and 5.7% had someone living alone who was 65 years of age or older. The average household size was 2.47 and the average family size was 2.81.

In the CDP, the population was spread out, with 24.5% under the age of 18, 5.6% from 18 to 24, 31.5% from 25 to 44, 26.9% from 45 to 64, and 11.5% who were 65 years of age or older. The median age was 39 years. For every 100 females, there were 103.8 males. For every 100 females age 18 and over, there were 103.8 males.

The median income for a household in the CDP was $33,939, and the median income for a family was $36,464. Males had a median income of $30,585 versus $25,063 for females. The per capita income for the CDP was $19,410. About 14.1% of families and 16.8% of the population were below the poverty line, including 17.9% of those under age 18 and 19.5% of those age 65 or over.

References

Census-designated places in Oregon
Unincorporated communities in Deschutes County, Oregon
Census-designated places in Deschutes County, Oregon
Unincorporated communities in Oregon